Alo Sila is a former American football lineman who played three seasons in the Arena Football League with the Sacramento Attack, Miami Hooters and San Jose SaberCats. He played college football at California State University, Northridge.

References

External links
Just Sports Stats

Living people
Year of birth missing (living people)
Players of American football from San Jose, California
American football offensive linemen
American football defensive linemen
Cal State Northridge Matadors football players
Sacramento Attack players
Miami Hooters players
San Jose SaberCats players